Mission San Juan Bautista is a Spanish mission in San Juan Bautista, San Benito County, California. Founded on June 24, 1797 by Fermín Lasuén of the Franciscan order, the mission was the fifteenth of the Spanish missions established in present-day California. Named for Saint John the Baptist, the mission is the namesake of the city of San Juan Bautista.

Barracks for the soldiers, a nunnery, the Jose Castro House, and other buildings were constructed around a large grassy plaza in front of the church and can be seen today in their original form. The Ohlone, the original residents of the valley, were brought to live at the mission and baptized, followed by Yokuts from the Central Valley. Mission San Juan Bautista has served mass daily since 1797, and today functions as a parish church of the Diocese of Monterey.

History 

Following its creation in 1797, San Juan's population grew quickly. By 1803, there were 1,036 Native Americans living at the mission. Ranching and farming activity had moved apace, with 1,036 cattle, 4,600 sheep, 22 swine, 540 horses and 8 mules counted that year. At the same time, the harvest of wheat, barley and corn was estimated at 2,018 fanegas, each of about 220 pounds.

Father Pedro Estévan Tápis (who had a special talent for music) joined Father Felipe Arroyo de la Cuesta, at Mission San Juan Bautista in 1815 to teach singing to the Native Americans. He employed a system of notation developed in Spain that uses varied colors or textures for polyphonic music, usually (from bottom to top) solid black, solid red, black outline (sometimes solid yellow) and red outline (or black outline when yellow was used). His choir of Native American boys performed for many visitors, earning the San Juan Bautista Mission the nickname "the Mission of Music." Two of his handwritten choir books are preserved at the San Juan Bautista Museum. When Father Tapis died in 1825 he was buried on the mission grounds. The town of San Juan Bautista, which grew up around the mission, expanded rapidly during the California Gold Rush and continues to be a thriving community today.

The mission is situated adjacent to the San Andreas Fault, and has suffered damage from numerous earthquakes, such as those of 1800 and 1906. However, the mission was never entirely destroyed at once. It was restored initially in 1884, and then again in 1949 with funding from the Hearst Foundation. The three-bell campanario, or "bell wall," located by the church entrance, was fully restored in 2010. An unpaved stretch of the original El Camino Real, just east of the mission, lies on a fault scarp.

Although initially secularized in 1835, the church was reconsecrated by the Roman Catholic Church in 1859, and continues to serve as a parish of the Diocese of Monterey. The mission includes a cemetery, with the remains of over 4,000 Native American converts and Europeans buried there.

The mission and its grounds were featured prominently in the 1958 Alfred Hitchcock film Vertigo. Associate producer Herbert Coleman's daughter Judy Lanini suggested the mission to Hitchcock as a filming location. A steeple, added sometime after the mission's original construction and secularization, had been demolished following a fire, so Hitchcock added a bell tower using scale models, matte paintings, and trick photography at the Paramount studio in Los Angeles. The tower does not resemble the original steeple. The tower's staircase was assembled inside a studio.

See also
 Spanish missions in California
 List of Spanish missions in California
 Rancho San Justo
 Teatro Campesino
 USNS Mission San Juan (AO-126) – a Buenaventura Class fleet oiler built during World War II.

References

Sources

External links

 Mission San Juan Bautista – official site
 Early photographs, sketches, land surveys of Mission San Juan Bautista, via Calisphere, California Digital Library
 
 Listing and photographs of church at the Historic American Buildings Survey
 Listing, drawings and photographs of mission at the Historic American Buildings Survey
 Another view of the Mission Facade, circa 1980s
 
 
 

San Juan Bautista
San Juan Bautista, California
1797 in Alta California
Museums in San Benito County, California
Religious museums in California
History museums in California
Churches in San Benito County, California
Cemeteries in California
1797 establishments in Alta California
California Historical Landmarks
Churches on the National Register of Historic Places in California
Roman Catholic Diocese of Monterey in California
History of San Benito County, California
Spanish Colonial architecture in California
National Register of Historic Places in San Benito County, California